Western Technical-Commercial School is a high school in the High Park North neighbourhood of Toronto, Ontario, Canada oversighted by the Toronto District School Board. It shares the same building with Ursula Franklin Academy and The Student School. The school was founded in 1927 and was part of the Toronto Board of Education until 1998.

Originally two schools when it was opened, Western Branch Technical School and Western High School of Commerce, the present school is now the product of the merger of the two.

Western, commonly called WTCS or Western Tech, offers courses from grade 9 through 12 in Academic and Gifted levels.

History
The main Collegiate Gothic building was constructed in 1927, with the addition being constructed in 1967–1970. The school features amenities such as a pool and two gyms, a greenhouse, a large library, and a media lab.

The school has been used as a filming location for a number of movies and TV shows, including Billy Madison, Being Erica, and The Queen's Gambit.

Media

In the 2000s, Western Tech students started a newspaper titled The Hidden Agenda, with issues printed as recently as 2011 and some online activity in 2012. It reported on student events and was run by students with final approval by the administration. In the 2022/2023 academic year, it was revived under the name The Horseshoe.

Athletics

The school has a wide variety of teams and intramurals, from the traditional soccer, basketball, hockey, water polo and baseball to ping pong and a Reach for the Top quiz team. Intramurals include floor hockey, volleyball, and basketball, among others. Western has a full size pool, and runs Bronze Medallion and Bronze Cross courses at greatly reduced prices for students of the school. Current aquatics leadership students are welcomed to assist in teaching the program.

Manufacturing Technology/Robotics
Western Technical-Commercial School offers a number of manufacturing technology courses utilizing the schools machine shop facilities. The school also has a successful FIRST Robotics team (865/Warp7).

Notable alumni

J. P. Anderson - hockey player
Gwendolyn McEwen - poet

See also
List of high schools in Ontario

References

External links
 Western Technical-Commercial School official website
 Western Technical-Commercial School profile on the Toronto District School Board website
 Western Technical-Commercial School Music Department

High schools in Toronto
Schools in the TDSB
Educational institutions established in 1927
1927 establishments in Ontario